The 232rd Infantry Brigade was a formation of the British Army during both the First and the Second World Wars.

First World War
It was assigned to the 75th Division and served in the Sinai and Palestine Campaign.  Units included:
1/5th (Prince of Wales's) Battalion, Devonshire Regiment
2/5th Battalion, Hampshire Regiment
1/4th Battalion, Duke of Cornwall's Light Infantry
2nd Battalion, Loyal North Lancashire Regiment
2nd Battalion, 3rd Gurkha Rifles
2/4th Battalion, Somerset Light Infantry
1/4th Battalion, Duke of Edinburgh's (Wiltshire Regiment)
72nd Punjabis
2/4th Battalion, Dorsetshire Regiment
3rd Battalion, Kashmir Rifles
229th Machine Gun Company 
232nd Trench Mortar Battery

Second World War
The 232nd Infantry Brigade was formed from the 2nd (Malta) Infantry Brigade. It was based in Malta and Egypt.

Commander was Brigadier F.A.J.E. Marshall.

Component Units 
2nd Battalion, King's Own Malta Regiment
3rd Battalion, King's Own Malta Regiment
2nd Battalion, Royal Irish Fusiliers
8th Battalion, King's Own Royal Regiment (Lancaster)
8th Battalion, Manchester Regiment

References

External links 
 

Infantry brigades of the British Army in World War I
232